The second album of Paprika Korps.
The album has been released in Lithuania by Kablio Muzika, in Russia by One Drop and in Finland by Kamaset levyt on an LP.

Track listing

 "Mind Explorer" - 3:08
 "Commin Inna" - 4:39
 "High Expectation" - 3:19
 "Facts Of Life" - 2:50
 "Radio" - 3:47
 "Fryzjer" - 2:40
 "Nothing But A Sorrow" - 2:53
 "Nothing Dub" - 3:07
 "Przede Wszystkim Muzyki" - 3:09
 "Commin Inna He" - 6:49
 "Sick Situation" - 2:40
 "High Remix (Mario Dziurex JVSS)" - 4:46
 "Fryzjer Remix (DJ Adamus - Pozytywka Sound System)" - 4:55
 "Mind Exploration (Yama)" - 3:49
 "Przede Wszystkim Muzyki Remix (Dr Emzetka)" - 4:57

2001 albums
Paprika Korps albums